The shark order Hexanchiformes (in a broad sense, not only comprising the cow sharks, but also including the frilled sharks, Chlamydoselachidae) is often considered the most primitive of extant sharks, since they share some features with Paleozoic and early-Mesozoic shark groups as the Cladoselachiformes. Thus, it is interesting to see how far back the fossil record of this order reaches.

Family Chlamydoselachidae

Family Hexanchidae

References

Hexanchiformes